Des chutes is French for of the falls, referring to waterfalls or rapids.

Deschutes or Des Chutes or variations may refer to:

Places
 Deschutes County, Oregon, a county in the U.S. state of Oregon
 Deschutes National Forest, a national forest in Oregon
 Deschutes River (Oregon), a river on the east side of Oregon's Cascade Range
 Little Deschutes River, a tributary of the Deschutes River in Oregon
 Deschutes River (Washington), a river in the U.S. state of Washington
 Deschutes River Woods, Oregon, a census-designated place in Oregon
 Rivière des Chutes (Batiscan River tributary) (Falls River), a river in Mauricie, Quebec, Canada

Facilities and structures
 Deschutes Hall, a building on the University of Oregon campus
 Deschutes Brewery, a brewery located in Bend, Oregon, USA
 Pont des Chutes (Falls Bridge), a covered bridge in Abitibi-Témiscamingue, Quebec, Canada
 École secondaire des Chutes (disambiguation) (
 Des Chutes Historical Museum, Bend, Deschutes, Oregon, USA
 Des Chutes Historical Center, Bend, Deschutes, Oregon, USA

Other uses
 Deschutes (microprocessor), code name for an improved edition of Intel's Pentium II
 Des Chutes Railroad, part of the Columbia Southern Railway

See also
 
 
 
 
 
 Chute (disambiguation)